Benson Babatunde Mayowa (born August 3, 1991) is an American football defensive end who is a free agent. He also was a member of the Dallas Cowboys, Arizona Cardinals, Oakland Raiders, and Seattle Seahawks. He played college football at the University of Idaho.

High school & college
Mayowa attended Inglewood High School, where as a senior defensive end, he had 75 tackles, 11 sacks, and one interception, while receiving All-league and second-team all-California Interscholastic Federation honors.

After not being heavily recruited because of his academic grades, he accepted a football scholarship from the University of Idaho. He was a backup defensive end as a true freshman, registering 6 tackles (2 for loss), one sack and one quarterback hurry. The next year he made 25 tackles (4.5 for loss), 3 sacks, one quarterback hurry, 2 passes defended, 3 forced fumbles and one recovered.

As a junior, he started 6 out of 10 games (missed 2 with an injury), posting 17 tackles (4.5 for loss), 3 sacks, 5 quarterback hurries, 2 passes defended, 2 forced fumbles and one recovered.

As a senior, he started 8 out of 11 games, making 22 tackles (7 for loss), 3 sacks, 4 quarterback hurries, one pass defended and 3 forced fumbles. He finished his college career with 45 games, 67 tackles (47 solo), 11 sacks, 11 forced fumbles, and 3 fumble recoveries.

Professional career

Seattle Seahawks
On May 13, 2013, he was signed by the Seattle Seahawks as an undrafted free agent, after participating on a tryout basis at rookie minicamp. He played the first two games and was declared inactive for the rest of the regular season. On August 30, 2014, he was waived during the final roster cuts.

Oakland Raiders
On August 31, 2014, he was claimed off waivers by the Oakland Raiders. On December 7, he recorded his first NFL sack against the San Francisco 49ers. He finished the season with 13 tackles and one sack.

In 2015, he had 16 tackles, one sack, one forced fumble and 2 fumble recoveries in 12 games.

Dallas Cowboys 
On March 18, 2016, the Dallas Cowboys signed him to a three-year $8.25 million offer sheet. On March 22, the Raiders declined to match the offer, officially allowing Mayowa to sign with the Cowboys without receiving any compensation.

Mayowa was acquired to provide depth at the defensive end position with the looming suspensions to DeMarcus Lawrence and Randy Gregory and the decision not to bring back Greg Hardy. At the time the signing surprised observers, because Mayowa had only 3 career starts and 2 sacks, while playing mostly as an outside linebacker.

He was placed on physically unable to perform list at the start of training camp, while recovering from a knee scope he underwent in June. He began the season as the starter at right defensive end, until losing his position after Lawrence returned from his four-game suspension. His role began to be reduced and against the Cincinnati Bengals, he played less snaps than Ryan Davis. He was declared inactive against the Pittsburgh Steelers, after being passed on the depth chart by Davis, because he was not providing the pass rush pressure that was expected from him. He was declared inactive against the Baltimore Ravens and Washington Redskins. He returned to the lineup against the Minnesota Vikings, experiencing an improvement in his play, while finishing with 6 sacks (led the team), making 4 of them in the last five games.

In 2017, he was limited at the start of training camp with knee soreness. Even though David Irving, Randy Gregory and Damontre Moore where suspended at the beginning of the regular season, Mayowa could not pass Tyrone Crawford on the depth chart at right defensive end. He suffered a back injury against the Oakland Raiders and missed the last 2 games. He finished with 21 tackles, one sack, 2 starts and was declared inactive in 2 games.

On March 7, 2018, Mayowa was released by the Cowboys.

Arizona Cardinals
On April 23, 2018, Mayowa signed with the Arizona Cardinals, to provide depth while defensive end Markus Golden recovered from a torn ACL. He played in 15 games with four starts, recording 38 tackles and four sacks.

Oakland Raiders (second stint)
On April 12, 2019, Mayowa signed with the Oakland Raiders.
In Week 1 against the Denver Broncos, Mayowa sacked Joe Flacco twice in the 24-16 win. In the week 2 defeat to the Kansas City Chiefs he sacked Patrick Mahomes in the 3rd Quarter 
In week 5 against the Chicago Bears, Mayowa sacked Chase Daniel once in the 24-21 win.

Seattle Seahawks (second stint)
On April 6, 2020, the Seattle Seahawks signed Mayowa to a one-year, $3 million contract. In Week 17 against the San Francisco 49ers, Mayowa recorded 2 sacks on C. J. Beathard, including a strip sack that was recovered by the Seahawks, during the 26–23 win.

On March 26, 2021, Seahawks re-signed Mayowa to a two-year contract.

On March 17, 2022, Mayowa was released by the Seahawks.

NFL career statistics

Personal life
Mayowa is of Nigerian descent.

References

External links
 Las Vegas Raiders bio
 Seattle Seahawks bio
 Idaho Vandals bio

1991 births
Living people
Players of American football from Inglewood, California
Players of American football from Los Angeles
American sportspeople of Nigerian descent
American football defensive ends
American football linebackers
Idaho Vandals football players
Seattle Seahawks players
Oakland Raiders players
Dallas Cowboys players
Arizona Cardinals players